Darreh Ja (also Romanized as Darreh Jā; also known as Darjā) is a village in Mahan Rural District, Mahan District, Kerman County, Kerman Province, Iran. At the 2006 census, its population was 12, in 6 families.

References 

Populated places in Kerman County